Epipyrops cerolestes is a moth in the Epipyropidae family. It was described by Tams in 1947. It is found in Tanzania.

References

Endemic fauna of Tanzania
Moths described in 1947
Epipyropidae